AOV could refer to:

Technology, science, and medicine
 aortic velocity (AoV), the speed of blood flow in the aorta of the heart
 aortic valve (AoV)
 Air operated valve
 Analysis of variance, also known as ANOVA
 Angle of view (AOV, AoV), a concept in photography and optics
 Automatic opening vent, a window or roof light that will open mechanically to allow smoke to be evacuated out of a building
 Arbitrary Output Variable, a feature of RenderMan
 Average Order Value, a term from advertising and marketing; see Post-click marketing

Arts and entertaiment
 Akademische Orchestervereinigung, an orchestra in Göttingen, Germany
 "AOV" (song), a song by Slipknot
 AOV Adult Movie Channel, a nationwide Canadian cable channel
 Arena of Valor, a multiplayer online battle arena developed and published by Tencent Games

Other
 Algemeen Ouderen Verbond, the General Elderly Alliance, a Dutch political party
 "Any other variety", a classification at cat shows for cats that do not qualify as something more specific under particular breed standards; see Oriental Shorthair

See also